Igor Nikitin may refer to:

 Igor Nikitin (weightlifter) (born 1952), Soviet weightlifter
 Igor Nikitin (businessman) (1965–2015), Russian television executive
 Igor Nikitin (ice hockey) (born 1973), Russian ice hockey player and coach